(O holy bath of Spirit and water), 165, is a church cantata by Johann Sebastian Bach. He composed it in Weimar for Trinity Sunday and led the first performance on 16 June 1715.

The libretto by the court poet Salomo Franck is based on the day's prescribed gospel reading about the meeting of Jesus and Nicodemus. It is close in content to the gospel and connects the concept of the Trinity to baptism.

The music is structured in six movements, alternating arias and recitatives, and scored for a small ensemble of four vocal parts, strings and continuo. The voices are combined only in the closing chorale, the fifth stanza of Ludwig Helmbold's hymn "", which mentions scripture, baptism and the Eucharist, in a summary of the cantata's topic. Based on the text full of Baroque imagery, Bach composed a sermon in music, especially in the two recitatives for the bass voice, and achieved contrasts in expression. He led the first performance, and probably another on the Trinity Sunday concluding his first year as Thomaskantor in Leipzig on 4 June 1724.

Background 

On 2 March 1714 Bach was appointed  (concert master) of the Weimar  (court chapel) of the co-reigning dukes Wilhelm Ernst and Ernst August of Saxe-Weimar. The position was created for him, possibly on his demand, giving him "a newly defined rank order" according to Christoph Wolff.

The pattern probably continued from 1704, when Strattner was succeeded by Drese's son Johann Wilhelm. When  Bach also assumed the principal responsibility for one cantata a month, the 's workload was further reduced to two Sundays per month.

The performance venue on the third tier of the court church, in German called  (Heaven's Castle), has been described by Wolff as "congenial and intimate", calling for a small ensemble of singers and players. Additional players of the military band were available when needed, and also town musicians and singers of the gymnasium. Bach as the concertmaster probably led the performances as the first violinist, while the organ part was played by Bach's students such as Johann Martin Schubart and Johann Caspar Vogler. Even in settings like chamber music, Bach requested a strong continuo section with cello, bassoon and violone in addition to the keyboard instrument.

Monthly cantatas from 1714 to 1715 

While Bach had composed vocal music only for special occasions until his promotion, the regular chance to compose and perform a new work resulted in a program into which Bach "threw himself wholeheartedly", as Christoph Wolff notes. In his first cantata of the series, for the double feast of Palm Sunday and Annunciation, he showed his skill in an elaborate work in eight movements, for four vocal parts and at times ten-part instrumental writing, and presenting himself as a violin soloist.

The following table of works performed by Bach as concertmaster between 1714 and the end of 1715 is based on tables by Wolff and Alfred Dürr. According to Dürr,  is the eleventh cantata composition of this period. The works contain arias and recitatives, as in contemporary opera, while earlier cantatas had concentrated on biblical text and chorale.

Topic and text

Trinity Sunday 
Bach composed  for Trinity Sunday, the Sunday concluding the first half of the liturgical year. The prescribed readings for the day were from the Epistle to the Romans, "What depth of the riches of the wisdom and knowledge of God", and from the Gospel of John, the meeting of Jesus and Nicodemus.

In Leipzig, Bach composed two more cantatas for the occasion which focused on different aspects of the readings, first composed for the inauguration of church and organ in Störmthal on 2 November 1723,  (1725) and the chorale cantata  (1726).

Cantata text 
The opening refers to Jesus' words in John 3:5: "Except a man be born of water and of the Spirit, he cannot enter into the kingdom of God."() The second movement, a recitative, reflects upon birth in the Spirit as baptism through God's grace: "" (In the bath of spirit and water he becomes a child of blessedness and grace). Movement 3, an aria for alto, considers that the bond has to be renewed throughout life, because it will be broken by man, reflected in movement 4. The last aria is a prayer for the insight that the death of Jesus brought salvation, termed "" (death's death). The cantata concludes with the fifth stanza of Ludwig Helmbold's hymn of 1575, "", mentioning scripture, baptism and the Eucharist. Bach used the eighth and final stanza, "Erhalt uns in der Wahrheit" (Keep us in the truth), to conclude his cantata Gott der Herr ist Sonn und Schild, BWV 79.

Salomon expresses his thought in Baroque style rich in imagery. The image of the serpent is used in several meanings: as the serpent which seduced Adam and Eve to sin in paradise, as the symbol which Moses erected in the desert, and related to the gospel's verse 14: "And as Moses lifted up the serpent in the wilderness, even so must the Son of man be lifted up".

Performance and publication 

Bach led the first performance of the cantata on 16 June 1715. The performance material for Weimar is lost. Bach performed the work again as Thomaskantor in Leipzig. Extant performance material was prepared by his assistant Johann Christian Köpping. The first possible revival is the Trinity Sunday of Bach's first year in office, 4 June 1724, also the conclusion of his first year and first Leipzig cantata cycle, because he had assumed the office on the first Sunday after Trinity the year before. Bach made presumably minor changes.

Music

Scoring and structure 

The title on the copy by Johann Christian Köpping is: "Concerto a 2 Violi:1 Viola. Fagotto Violoncello S.A.T.e Basso e Continuo / di Joh:Seb:Bach" (Concerto for 2 violins, 1 viola. Bassoon Cello S.A.T and Bass and Continuo / by Joh:Seb:Bach). The cantata in six movements is scored like chamber music for four vocal soloists (soprano, alto, tenor and bass), a four-part choir (SATB) in the closing chorale, two violins (Vl), viola (Va), bassoon (Fg), cello (Vc) and basso continuo (Bc). The bassoon is called for, but has no independent part. The duration is given as about 15 minutes.

In the following table of the movements, the scoring follows the Neue Bach-Ausgabe, and the abbreviations for voices and instruments the list of Bach cantatas. The keys and time signatures are taken from the Bach scholar Alfred Dürr, using the symbol for common time (4/4). The instruments are shown separately for winds and strings, while the continuo, playing throughout, is not shown.

Movements 

The cantata consists of solo movements closed by a four-part chorale. Arias alternate with two recitatives, both sung by the bass. John Eliot Gardiner summarizes: "It is a true sermon in music, based on the Gospel account of Jesus' night-time conversation with Nicodemus on the subject of 'new life', emphasising the spiritual importance of baptism." He points out the many musical images of water.

1 

In the first aria, "" (O bath of Holy Spirit and of water), the ritornello is a fugue, whereas in the five vocal sections the soprano and violin I are a duo in imitation on the same material. These sections are composed in symmetry, A B C B' A'. The theme of B involves an inversion of material from A, that of C is derived from measure 2 of the ritornello. Dürr writes:

2 

The first recitative, "" (The sinful birth of the cursed heirs of Adam), is secco, but several phrases are close to an arioso. The musicologist Julian Mincham notes that Bach follows the meaning of the text closely, for example by "rhythmic dislocations for death and destruction", a change in harmony on "poisoned", and "the complete change of mood at the mention of the blessed Christian". He summarizes: "Here anger and resentment at Man’s inheritance of suppurating sin is contrasted against the peace and joy of God-given salvation".

3 

The second aria, "" (Jesus, who out of great love), accompanied by the continuo, is dominated by an expressive motif with several upward leaps of sixths, which is introduced in the ritornello and picked up by the alto voice in four sections. Mincham notes that "the mood is serious and reflective but also purposeful and quietly resolute".

4 

The second recitative, "" (I have indeed, o bridegroom of my soul), is accompanied by the strings (accompagnato), marked by Bach "Rec: con Stroment" (Recitative: with instruments). The German musicologist Klaus Hofmann notes that the text turns to mysticism, reflecting the Bridegroom, Lamb of God and the serpent in its double meaning. The text is intensified by several melismas, a marking "adagio" on the words "" (most holy Lamb of God), and by melodic parts for the instruments. Gardiner notes that Bach has images for the serpent displayed in the desert by Moses, and has the accompaniment fade away on the last line "" (when all my strength has faded).

5 

The last aria, "" (Jesus, death of my death), is set for tenor, accompanied by the violins in unison, marked "Aria Violini unisoni e Tenore". The image of the serpent appears again, described by the composer and musicologist William G. Whittaker: "the whole of the obbligato for violins in unison is constructed out of the image of the bending, writhing, twisting reptile, usually a symbol of horror, but in Bach's musical speech a thing of pellucid beauty".

6 

The cantata closes with a four-part setting of the chorale stanza,  (His word, His baptism, His communion).
The text in four short lines summarizes that Jesus helps any in need by his words, his baptism and his communion, and ends in the prayer that the Holy Spirit may teach to faithfully trust in this.

The hymn tune by Nikolaus Selnecker was first published in Leipzig in 1587 in the hymnal Christliche Psalmen, Lieder vnd Kirchengesenge (Christian psalms, songs and church chants). Bach marked the movement: "", indicating that the instruments play  with the voices.

Recordings 

The entries are taken from the listing on the Bach Cantatas Website. Instrumental ensmbles playing period instruments in historically informed performance are marked by green background.

Notes

References

Bibliography 
Scores
 
 

Books
 
 
 

Online sources

The complete recordings of Bach's cantatas are accompanied by liner notes from musicians and musicologists; Gardiner commented on his Bach Cantata Pilgrimage, Hofmann wrote for Masaaki Suzuki, and Wolff for Ton Koopman.

External links 
 
 
 
 
 
 Luke Dahn: BWV 165.6 bach-chorales.com

1715 compositions
Church cantatas by Johann Sebastian Bach
Nicodemus
Works based on the New Testament